Lepisanthes unilocularis was a species of plant in the family Sapindaceae. It was endemic to China. It is extinct in nature, having last been seen in 1935.

References

unilocularis
Endemic flora of China
Extinct flora of Asia
Flora of Hainan
Taxonomy articles created by Polbot
Taxobox binomials not recognized by IUCN